Kenneth James McKnight (born 8 April 1964) is a New Zealand former cricketer. He played eight first-class matches for Otago between 1987 and 1992.

McKnight's highest first-class score was 56 not out against Central Districts in 1988-89, when he helped Otago save the match after they followed on 231 runs behind. Later he captained Central Otago to their only title in the Hawke Cup, when they defeated Taranaki in January 1996. He now lives in Queensland.

See also
 List of Otago representative cricketers

References

1964 births
Living people
New Zealand cricketers
Otago cricketers
People from Ranfurly, New Zealand